Fúlmine is a 1949 Argentine film directed by Luis Bayón Herrera. It is based in the Guillermo Divito's comic strip Fúlmine character.

Cast
 Pepe Arias
 Pierina Dealessi
 Julio Renato
 Homero Cárpena
 Marga Landova
 Eduardo Otero
 Adolfo Stray
 Domingo Mania
 Ana Palmero
 Fanny Stein
 Coca Villalba
 Ángel Boffa
 Susana Campos
 Arturo Arcari
 Agustín Andrades
 Pablo Cumo
 María Esther Corán

References

External links
 

1949 films
1940s Spanish-language films
Argentine black-and-white films
Films directed by Luis Bayón Herrera
Films based on Argentine comics
Live-action films based on comics
Argentine comedy films
1949 comedy films
1940s Argentine films